Margaret Joyce Haddelsey (1 December 1897 – 1977) was an English cricketer who played as a slow left-arm orthodox bowler. She appeared in two Test matches for England in 1937, both against Australia. Her sister, Muriel, also played one match on the tour. She played domestic cricket for various regional and local teams, including Midlands Women.

References

External links
 
 

1897 births
1977 deaths
People from Moseley
England women Test cricketers